Alucheh may refer to:
Alucheh Malek, Iran
Alucheh-ye Fuladlu, Iran
Alucheh-ye Sabalan, Iran